Nikola Mektić and Mate Pavić defeated Pablo Andújar and Matwé Middelkoop in the final, 2–6, 6–2, [10–3] to win the doubles tennis title at the 2022 Geneva Open.

John Peers and Michael Venus were the defending champions, but chose not to compete this year.

Seeds

Draw

Draw

References

External links
Main draw

Geneva Open - Doubles
Doubles
2022 in Swiss sport